Barnstable station was a railway station located on Railroad Avenue in Barnstable, Massachusetts. It was constructed in 1889 by the Old Colony Railroad. From the latter years of the 19th century to the 1950s, the station served daily New Haven Railroad trains from Boston, and due for points further east on the Cape. For several decades in the mid-20th century, the station also served the New Haven's day and night versions of its seasonal New York - Hyannis Cape Codder trains. The station was torn down after the New Haven ended passenger rail service to the Cape in 1959.

References

External links

Barnstable, Massachusetts
Old Colony Railroad Stations on Cape Cod
Stations along Old Colony Railroad lines
Former railway stations in Massachusetts
1889 establishments in Massachusetts
1959 disestablishments in Massachusetts
Railway stations in the United States opened in 1889
Railway stations closed in 1959